Naudīte Parish is an administrative unit of Dobele Municipality, Latvia.

Towns, villages and settlements of Naudīte Parish 
Naudīte
Apgulde
Līdumi

References 

Dobele Municipality
Parishes of Latvia